Mount Roland is a mountain, directly north of Mount Mooney on the north flank of Robison Glacier, in the Queen Maud Mountains. Mapped by United States Geological Survey (USGS) from surveys and U.S. Navy air photos, 1960–64. Named by Advisory Committee on Antarctic Names (US-ACAN) for Lieutenant (j.g.) Charles J. Roland, aircraft navigator with U.S. Navy Squadron VX-6 on Operation Deep Freeze 1966 and 1967.

References
 

Mountains of Marie Byrd Land
Queen Maud Mountains